Mario Besesti (20 November 1894 – 21 June 1968) was an Italian actor and voice actor.

Biography 
Besesti began a career acting on stage and screen in 1932. He made his film debut in 1938 and among his most popular filmography includes the 1949 film The Mill on the Po. Besesti was also well known as a voice dubber. Because of his strong voice and large build, he usually dubbed actors with the same stature such as Charles Laughton, Edward Arnold, Thomas Mitchell, Raymond Massey, Sydney Greenstreet, Charles Coburn and many more.

Besesti was considered to be one of Italy's most significant, well-known dubbers during the Golden Ages. He worked for the Cooperativa Doppiatori Cinematografici and made collaborations with other dubbers which included Gualtiero De Angelis, Lauro Gazzolo, Carlo Romano, Wanda Tettoni and Nino Pavese.

Besesti was also active in the Italian dubs of some of the early Disney animated films. He dubbed Stromboli in Pinocchio, The Huntsman in Snow White and the Seven Dwarfs and Trusty in Lady and the Tramp.

Death 
Besesti died in Rome on 21 June 1968 at the age of 73.

Filmography

Cinema 
 Pride (1938)
 Then We'll Get a Divorce (1940)
 Short Circuit (1943)
 O sole mio (1945)
 Eugenia Grandet (1947)
 The Mill on the Po (1949)
 La Rosa di Bagdad (1949) – Voice
 My Beautiful Daughter (1950)
 The Thief of Venice (1950)

Dubbing roles

Animation 
 Stromboli in Pinocchio
 The Huntsman in Snow White and the Seven Dwarfs
 Narrator in Dumbo
 Trusty in Lady and the Tramp
 The King in Cinderella
 Walrus in Alice in Wonderland
 Great Prince of the Forest in Bambi
 King Bombo in Gulliver's Travels

Live action 
 Phineas V. Lambert in If I Had a Million
 Quasimodo in The Hunchback of Notre Dame
 Sir Humphrey Pengallan in Jamaica Inn
 William Kidd in Captain Kidd
 Albert Lory in This Land Is Mine
 Uncle William "Billy" Bailey in It's a Wonderful Life
 Michael Howland in Within These Walls
 Tom Blue in The Black Swan
 Thad Vail in High Barbaree
 Reginald "Rags" Barnaby in Destry
 Jim Taylor in Mr. Smith Goes to Washington
 Amory Stilham in Mrs. Parkington
 Judge Wilkins in Dear Wife
 Penrod Biddel in City That Never Sleeps
 Jimmy Norton in Meet John Doe
 Wolf Larsen in The Sea Wolf
 James R. Judson in From Here to Eternity
 Pablo in For Whom the Bell Tolls
 Pancho Villa in Viva Villa!
 Max Fabian in All About Eve

References

External links

 

1894 births
1968 deaths
20th-century Italian male actors
Italian male voice actors
Italian male film actors
Italian male stage actors
Male actors from Milan